Kwak Sin-ae (born 23 October 1968) is a South Korean film producer who is the CEO of the Seoul-based Barunson Entertainment & Arts Corporation, best known as a producer of the 2019 film Parasite. She and Bong Joon-ho won the Academy Award for Best Picture at the 2020 Academy Awards for Parasite, which also received the award for Best Feature Film at the Asia Pacific Screen Awards, and was nominated for Best Film at the 73rd British Academy Film Awards.

References 

South Korean film producers
Producers who won the Best Picture Academy Award
1968 births
Living people
South Korean women film producers